Boyd Estus is a director of photography and producer/director in the motion picture industry whose credits include the Academy Award-winning The Flight of the Gossamer Condor, the Academy Award-nominated Eight Minutes to Midnight, and many Emmy-winning television programs. He has worked on location around the world shooting and directing feature films and documentaries.

Career

Boyd Estus has extensive experience in the production of film documentaries dealing with history, music, and science. An innovator in the development of technique of "docu-drama" for compelling storytelling, Estus is known for making his subjects vivid and understandable to a broad audience.

Boyd Estus has received numerous awards including the CINE Golden Eagle (Where the Galaxies Are, Arthur Fiedler--Just Call Me Maestro, Flight of the Gossamer Condor), Melbourne International Film Festival Kino Award (So Many Galaxies...So Little Time), the Peabody Award (NOVA, Tender Places), the Cindy, Emmy, Telly, Hugo Award, and many others.

In addition to making films for the BBC and other overseas broadcasters, Estus has made many films for American broadcast television including the National Geographic Society, the Smithsonian Institution, the History Channel, the Discovery Channel, and PBS television where he was a founding member of the film unit at WGBH Boston.

Filmography

American Experience (PBS)
Murder at Harvard
Annie Oakley
Streamliner
Secrets of a Master Builder (James Eads)
Houdini
Ulysses S. Grant
Public Enemy #1:  Dillinger
Alone on the Ice (Admiral Byrd)
Reconstruction
Golden Gate Bridge

Frontline (PBS)
Apocalypse (BBC co-production)
The O.J. Verdict
Harvest of Fear (NOVA co-prod.)
From Jesus to Christ (BBC co-prod.)
Exonerated
Organ Farm
Commanding Heights (BBC co-prod.)

NOVA (PBS)
Typhoid Mary:  The Most Dangerous Woman in America
Pharaoh's Obelisk (Secrets of Lost Empires)
Search for a Safe Cigarette
Survivor MD (sub-series)
China Bridge (Secrets of Lost Empires)
Deadly Shadow of Vesuvius
Cut to the Heart
Kidnapped by UFO’s?
Medieval Siege (Secrets of Lost Empires)
Roman Bath (Secrets of Lost Empires)
So You Want to be a Doctor?
Animal Hospital
Eclipse of the Century

PBS Television
Benjamin Franklin
The Real Louisa May Alcott
Woody Guthrie:  I Ain’t Got No Home
Antiques Roadshow FYI
At Home in Utopia
The Powder and the Glory
Some Kinda Funny "Porto Rican"?
The New Medicine
NOW (PBS Public Affairs)
Earthbound
Religious America

National Educational Television; WGBH
Between Time and Timbuktu

BBC, Channel 4 (UK), et al.
History of Soul Music
Hiroshima
Together On Broadway (Kiri Te Kanawa & André Previn)
ABBA
The Big Fight
Heaven & Earth (James Taylor)
Me and Uncle Sam
Three Tales (Steve Reich)
The British Empire (American Revolution)
DNA (NOVA co-prod.)
Angry America (A&E co-prod.)

History Channel + Discovery Channel + HBO
The Conquerors: General  William Howe
Forensics of the Bible
Anything2Win
Hitler’s Last Book
Prophets of Science Fiction
Shay’s Rebellion
Breaking Vegas
Armageddon
George Washington & The Generals
TR – An American Lion
Unsolved History:  Forensic Presidents, Salem...Witch Trials, Aztec, Pearl Harbor
History’s Mysteries:  The Strange Case of Lizzie Borden
The American Presidency
Brilliant Minds
Amazing Medical
Stealth and Beyond
Boomer Nation
Hope Diamond
Miracle Hunters
The Real JAG’s
Reel Sex
Breathing Room
Unsolved Mysteries (NBC, CBS, Lifetime)
Building the New MFA

References

External links

Boyd Estus: Director of Photography
Heliotrope Studios

American film directors
Living people
Year of birth missing (living people)